Daniel or Dan Greenberg may refer to:

Dan Greenberg (born 1965), American politician and Republican member of the Arkansas House of Representatives
Daniel Greenberg (educator) (1934–2021), columnist and educator
Daniel Greenberg (game designer), role-playing and video game designer
Daniel S. Greenberg (1931–2020), American editor, author, and science journalist
Daniel Greenberg (author) (born 1965), writes on legislation and machinery of government issues
Daniel Greenberg, Israeli model married to singer Eyal Golan

See also
Dan Greenburg (born 1936), American author